Creative UK (known as Creative England from 2010 to 2021) is a not-for-profit organisation that supports the creative industries in the United Kingdom. The business promotes the development of creative companies, which in turn support business across games, film, creative and digital media as well as production services. The company works in partnership with the British Film Institute, has offices in Bristol and Salford, and operates predominantly outside of the city of London.

On 24 November 2021, Creative England and Creative Industries Federation combined forces under the newly formed Creative UK, having previously worked together since 2019 under the Creative UK Group. The launch coincided with updated branding across the organisation and a new tag line; Here for those who dare to imagine.

Creative UK currently supports filmmaking opportunities shortFLIX, in collaboration with Sky Arts,  iFeatures with the BFI and BBC Films, and Breakout with Netflix. These provide mentoring and funding to emerging film makers.

In 2021, they launched the 'Creative Coalition Festival' to "bring together the UK’s finest creators, innovators, leaders and emerging talent". In 2022, speakers included; Jed Mercurio, June Sarpong, Nadine Dorries, Jo Johnson, Rebecca Ferguson, Heather Rabbatts, and Nicholas Serota.

Creative England 
Creative England was founded in 2010, formed by the consolidation of a number of regional screen agencies into one body after the UK government dismantled the UK Film Council in 2011. It was funded by both public and private investment and developed partnerships and collaborations with companies including Google, Facebook and KPMG, as well as local authorities, cultural bodies and universities, national government, and the European Commission. The organisation aimed to support original storytellers, driving diversity, collaboration and growth in the creative screen industries.  Creative England and Microsoft launched Greenshoots in 2013, a game development competition which provides funding and market advice from industry experts to the winners.
In 2015, Creative England launched a £1m fund, used to support entrepreneurs in film, television, games and digital media in English cities and regions beyond the capital. CEO Caroline Norbury MBE stating "our cities and regions are vibrant centres of creativity that have delivered classic films, iconic architecture, world-class writers and ground-breaking technology".

iFeatures 

Launched in Bristol in 2010, supported by the BBC and South West Screen, iFeatures began as a way to nurture the cities "most outstanding creative talent" as well as attract up-and-coming filmmakers from across the UK and Europe. The following year, it was launched nationwide.

Since its creation, iFeatures has gone on to help fund 20 feature films, including Lady Macbeth, The Levelling, The Goob, and, flagship film, In the Dark Half.

shortFLIX

Shortflix (stylised as 'shortFLIX') is an initiative for new filmmakers aged 18–25 to make short films for broadcast on Sky Arts, its focus being those who have had fewer opportunities to get started in filmmaking, including those who are currently underrepresented in the industry.

Partnered with the BFI and National Youth Theatre,  shortFLIX launched in May 2017 with the first five short films exploring subjects including black gay dancehall culture in London, homophobia in an Afro-Caribbean hair salon in Sheffield and a suicidal young man in Bath. In an interview with Game of Thrones actress, Ellie Kendrick, Norbury explains that the organisation was set up "to combat the challenge that whilst talent might be everywhere, opportunity is not" adding that shortFLIX enables "talented new filmmakers from diverse backgrounds to tell their story about their community and identity". The films were produced by Manchester-based production company Delaval Film.

In 2020, Carrie Battram, Johnny Massahi, Danny Seymour, John Akinde, and Isabella Culver were announced as the next recipients of the scheme which also received a boost in funding from ScreenSkills, a London-based non-profit specialising in the promotion of new talent. Due to the ongoing COVID-19 pandemic, the second cohort of shortFLIX filmmakers have yet to complete their projects.

The UK Creative Industries report 
On 21 July 2021, the Creative UK Group launched The UK Creative Industries, the first report of its kind, exploring the power and potential of the UK's creative industries to regenerate places, rebuild the economy, drive innovation and create jobs in all parts of the UK.

Set to be published annually, and featuring voices ranging from comedian and film entrepreneur Lenny Henry to newly elected Mayor of West Yorkshire Tracy Brabin, former minister of state Jo Johnson and KISS FM's Swarzy, the report shows how creativity can not only enable us to bounce back from the pandemic, but carve out a new position for the UK on the global stage.

Creative Industries Federation 

The Creative Industries Federation was a national organisation for all the UK's creative industries, cultural education and arts. It advocated for the sector, aiming to ensure that the creative industries are central to political, economic and social decision-making.

Rebrand to Creative UK 
Having worked together under the name 'Creative UK Group', in November 2021, Creative England and Creative Industries Federation decided to merge and create 'Creative UK'.

Within Creative UK's launch statement, CEO Caroline Norbury MBE stated "Our new identity embraces the core values behind our founding organisations, while looking firmly toward the stronger future we want to foster for our sector. By coalescing the collective capabilities of Creative England and the Creative Industries Federation, and drawing on the insights and experience of our growing membership, we are perfectly positioned to have visible impact and drive real change."

Breakout 
In 2022, Creative UK's Head of Film, Paul Ashton, announced a partnership with Netflix UK for first-time feature film directors called "Breakout". Participants will be made up of six teams, each of which will receive £30,000 ($40,000) worth of development funding in addition to a Creative U.K. training program consisting of mentoring and residential lab events. Netflix executives will also provide support and input. 

Following residential workshops, at least one film will be greenlit with an approximate £1.5m budget and a global launch on Netflix.

Speaking on "Breakout", Hannah Perks, Netflix’s content acquisitions manager said: “We know there are so many brilliant emerging genre voices in the U.K. with bold, ambitious stories to tell who lack the funding to reach their audience [...] We’re committed through our U.K. features initiative to creating a talent pipeline for Netflix and the wider industry to elevate and develop the widest range of voices. We can’t wait to introduce exciting new U.K. talent to our members all around the globe".

References

External links
Official website

Arts organisations based in England
British Film Institute
Film organisations in England
2011 establishments in England
Governance of England
Government agencies established in 2011